The A-91 is a bullpup assault rifle developed during the 1990s by KBP Instrument Design Bureau in Tula, Soviet Union as an offspring of the 9A-91 firearm family.

Design
The A-91 retains the simple gas-operated, rotating bolt action and a trigger unit design from the 9A-91, it features a bullpup polymer housing, with an integral 40 mm single-shot grenade launcher mounted under the barrel. The earliest prototypes of the A-91 bullpup were added with the grenade launcher above the barrel, and with a frontal vertical foregrip; current models are fitted with the underbarrel launcher, which serves as a forearm. The A-91 has a forward ejection system, initially developed in Tula by designers like Afanasiev during the early 1960s. In this system, the ejection port is located right above the pistol grip, and is directed forward. Extracted cases go from bolt head through the short ejection tube to the ejection port, and fall out of the gun well clear of the shooter's face, even when firing from the left shoulder. As for now, the A-91 is made in small numbers and, probably, is used by some elite police units in Russia; it is also offered for export and domestic military and police sales.

ADS amphibious rifle
In early XXI century designers at KBP designed a dual medium rifle called ADS. The rifle is heavily based on the A-91, but can use 5.45×39mm PSP underwater cartridge. The rifle is in service with Russian combat divers.

Gallery

External links
Firearms Russia

5.45×39mm assault rifles
5.56×45mm NATO assault rifles
7.62×39mm assault rifles
Grenade launchers
Assault rifles of Russia
Bullpup rifles
Caseless firearms
KBP Instrument Design Bureau products